Philip Baker   (September 19, 1856 – June 4, 1940) was an American first baseman, outfielder and catcher in Major League Baseball from 1883–1886. He played in the minors from 1878–1889, with the exception of 1880–1882 when he was blacklisted. Before Baker got blacklisted from the MLB he started his career in the Baltimore Orioles organization, where he spent one year playing (AA) then he went on and played for the Washington Nationals. He played his last game in the majors when he was 29 years old, then returned to the minors to finish his career at the age of 33.

References

Sources

1856 births
1940 deaths
19th-century baseball players
Major League Baseball catchers
Major League Baseball first basemen
Major League Baseball outfielders
Baseball players from Philadelphia
Baltimore Orioles (AA) players
Washington Nationals (UA) players
Washington Nationals (1886–1889) players
Hornellsville Hornells players
Washington Nationals (minor league) players
Troy Trojans (minor league) players
Rochester Jingoes players